Alirio Ugarte Pelayo (Parroquia Anzoátegui, 21 January 1923 – 19 May 1966), was a Venezuelan politician, journalist, diplomat and lawyer.

Early life and education 
He gained a doctorate in political science from the Central University of Venezuela in 1946.

Career 
He was appointed Governor of Monagas state (1949–1951) under the military junta set up after the 1948 Venezuelan coup d'état. After the restoration of democracy in 1958, he joined the Democratic Republican Union (URD). He was Ambassador to Mexico (1959–1962), and was elected to the Venezuelan Chamber of Deputies in the 1963 elections, becoming President of the Chamber. He was a member of the Supreme Electoral Council from 1959 to 1964.

Ugarte Pelayo became Secretary General of the URD in 1965, and appeared likely to gain the URD presidential nomination for the 1968 election. In response URD leader Jóvito Villalba, who wanted to be re-nominated, had Ugarte Pelayo suspended from the URD in April 1966. The vote of the URD National Directorate fell 16 to 12, and "it soon became evident that if Ugarte left the party over his suspension, he would take with him the twelve members of the National Directorate who had backed him against Villalba, eight congressmen, and at least ten state organizations." Ugarte Pelayo announced the creation of a new party, Movimiento Demócrata Independiente, and was found dead in his home on 19 May by reporters he had invited for a press conference, an apparent suicide.

A street in Maturín, Avenida Alirio Ugarte Pelayo, is named for him.

Books 
 Destino democrático de Venezuela (1960), Editorial América Nueva.

See also 

 List of Venezuelans

References 

1923 births
1966 deaths
Governors of Monagas
Venezuelan journalists
Ambassadors of Venezuela to Mexico
Presidents of the Venezuelan Chamber of Deputies
Democratic Republican Union politicians
Central University of Venezuela alumni
20th-century Venezuelan lawyers
Suicides by firearm in Venezuela
20th-century journalists